Jalan Gelang Patah–Ulu Choh (Johor state route J7) is a major road in Johor, Malaysia.

List of junctions

Gelang Patah-Ulu Choh